Jihlava Zoo is a zoo in Jihlava in the Czech Republic.

Characteristics
Jihlava Zoo is located in a valley of the Jihlávka Stream, and is home to about 250 species of exotic animals, including endangered species. The zoo specializes in breeding of big carnivores, monkeys and reptiles.

History
Jihlava Zoo was founded in 1982.

In 1994, the zoo was accepted as a member of the European Association of Zoos and Aquaria (EAZA).

References

External links

Zoos in the Czech Republic
Buildings and structures in Jihlava
Zoos established in 1982
1982 establishments in Czechoslovakia
20th-century architecture in the Czech Republic